The seventh season of American Dad! aired from October 3, 2010 to May 22, 2011. Guest stars of this season include Jason Alexander, Sarah Chalke, Hector Elizondo, Anthony Michael Hall, Hayden Panettiere, Lou Diamond Phillips and Burt Reynolds.


Episode list

Home media release
All nineteen episodes of the seventh season were released on DVD by 20th Century Fox in the United States on April 17, 2012 and in the United Kingdom on May 14, 2012.

References

External links

2010 American television seasons
2011 American television seasons